The following are the national records in athletics in Nauru maintained by the Nauru Athletics Association (NAA).

Outdoor

Key to tables:

ht = hand timing

# = not officially ratified by NAA or/and IAAF

Men

†: result obtained during the octathlon.

Women

Indoor

Men

Women

References

External links

Nauru
Records
Athletics
Athletics